Iwan Bloch (April 8, 1872 – November 21, 1922), also known as Ivan Bloch, was a German dermatologist, and psychiatrist, psychoanalyst born in Delmenhorst, Grand Ducal Oldenburg, Germany, and often called the first sexologist. 

Together with Magnus Hirschfeld and Albert Eulenburg, Bloch is known for having proposed the new concept of a science of sexuality  (Sexualwissenschaft) or sexology. In 1906 he wrote in German the book Das Sexualleben unserer Zeit in seinen Beziehungen zur modernen Kultur which was translated as The Sexual Life of our Time in its Relations to Modern Civilization, a complete encyclopedia of the sexual sciences in their relation to modern civilization.

He is also known for having discovered the Marquis de Sade's manuscript of The 120 Days of Sodom, which had been believed to be lost, and published it under the pseudonym Eugène Dühren in 1904. He had previously published Marquis de Sade: his life and works. in 1899 under the same pseudonym, which he used later for the publishing of more works about Sade and Rétif de la Bretonne.

Legacy
According to Sigmund Freud, Bloch's studies were instrumental in the development of the anthropological approach to the theory of sexuality. Before Bloch, homosexuality was analyzed using a pathological approach.

Handbook of Sexology and other works

Iwan Bloch began the publication of his Handbuch der gesamten Sexualwissenschaft in Einzeldarstellungen (Handbook of Sexology in its Entirety Presented in Separate Studies) in 1912. Three volumes appeared until the project was aborted because of Bloch's untimely death at age 50, in 1922.

Handbuch der Gesamten Sexualwissenschaft in Einzeldarstellungen
(Band 1, Band 2, Band 3: Louis Marcus, Berlin, 1912–25): 
I. Die Prostitution. Hälfte 1 (1912)
II. Die Prostitution. Hälfte 2 with Georg Loewenstein was issued in Berlin by Louis Marcus in 1925
III. Die Homosexualität des Mannes und des Weibes. (with Magnus Hirschfeld) (1914)

He had published earlier:

Irrungen menschlicher Liebe (n.d., as Veriphantor)

Das Versehen der Frauen in Vergangenheit und Gegenwart und die Anschauungen der Aerzte, Naturforscher und Philosophen darüber (1899, as Gerhard von Welsenburg)

Der Marquis de Sade und seine Zeit. Ein Beitrag zur Cultur- und Sittengeschichte des 18. Jahrhunderts. Mit besonderer Beziehung auf die Lehre von der Psychopathia Sexualis (1900 as Eugen Dühren 1. Aufl. Barsdorf, Berlin, 1900; Max von Harrwitz, Berlin, 1904; 5. Aufl. Barsdorf, Berlin, 1915, in series:Studien zur Geschichte des menschlichen Geschlechtslebens Bd. 1.; Altogether 7 editions in his lifetime. Reissued in 1978: Heyne, München )

Der Ursprung der Syphilis. Eine medizinische und kulturgeschichtliche Untersuchung (G. Fischer, Jena, 1901)

Beiträge zur Aetiologie der "Psychopathia sexualis" (Dohrn, Dresden, 1902)

Das Geschlechtsleben in England, mit besonderer Beziehung auf London, Studien zur Geschichte des menschlichen Geschlechtslebens as Eugen Dühren, in four volumes:
I. Die beiden Erscheinungsformen des Sexuallebens. Die Ehe und die Prostitution.
II-III. Der Einfluss äusserer Faktoren auf das Geschlechtsleben in England. (M. Lilienthal, 1901-03.)
IV. Das Geschlechtsleben in England (3 vols. Berlin: H. Barsdorf)

Der Fetischismus (1903, as Veriphantor)

Das erste Auftreten der Syphilis (Lustseuche) in der europäischen Kulturwelt. Gewürdigt in seiner weltgeschichtlichen Bedeutung, dargestellt nach Anfang, Verlauf und vorraussichtlichem Ende (Fischer, Jena, 1904)

Rétif de la Bretonne. Der Mensch, der Schriftsteller, der Reformator, (Max Harrwitz, Berlin, 1906, as Eugen Dühren)

Rétif-Bibliothek. Verzeichnis der französischen und deutschen Ausgaben und Schriften von und über Nicolas Edme Restif de la Bretonne (bibliography of, Berlin, 1906, as Eugen Dühren)

Die sexuelle Osphresiologie (1906, as Albert Hagen)

Das Sexualleben unserer Zeit in seinen Beziehungen zur modernen Kultur (Louis Marcus, Verlagbuchhandlung, Berlin, 1907)  (this fundamental work appeared in many later editions)

Englische Sittengeschichte (earlier: Das Geschlechtsleben in England) (Two volumes, 1912, as Eugen Dühren)

Were published after his death:

Die Prostitution (the 2nd volume appeared posthumously in 1925)

Anthropological Studies on the Strange Sexual Practices of All Races and All Ages (1933, reprint in 2001)

 A History of English Sexual Morals; (translated by William H. Forstern. London: Francis  Aldor, 1936)

 Sexual Life in England, Past and Present (London: Alfred Aldor, 1938)

in English (abridged): Marquis de Sade. His life and his works; (translated by James Bruce. Castle/ Book Sales, NY 1948, 128 pp.) 

(French and Spanish translations were also issued.)

Neue Forschungen über den Marquis de Sade und seine Zeit. Mit besonderer Berücksichtigung der Sexualphilosophie de Sade's auf Grund des neuentdeckten Original-Manuskriptes seines Hauptwerkes (as Eugen Dühren, reprint 1965; and again by VDM Verlag Dr. Müller, Saarbrücken, 2007)

 Projekt Gutenberg-DE:  Bibliothek der Sexualwissenschaft 36 Klassiker als Faksimile auf DVD. Hille & Partner

Notes

References
White M. J. (1972). New Zealand Psychologist, Vol. 1 Issue 1: "The legacy of Iwan Bloch (1872–1922)".
Der Papiertiger: Bloch, Iwan

Further reading
 Wolfgang Büsing: "Ido Wolff und seine Sippe. Ein berühmter Wundarzt des 17. Jahrhunderts aus Oldenburg" in: his: Glück, Heil und Segen angewünschet. Familiengeschichtliche und heimatkundliche Beiträge aus dem Oldenburgischen Oldenburg: Heinz Holzberg, 1988 ; pp. 43–51
 Günther Grau: Iwan Bloch. Hautarzt - Medizinhistoriker - Sexualforscher, Berlin: Hentrich & Hentrich Verlag, 2007 
Erwin J. Haeberle: "Iwan Bloch (1872 - 1922)" in: „Meinetwegen ist die Welt erschaffen“. Das intellektuelle Vermächtnis des deutschsprachigen Judentums. 58 Portraits, Frankfurt: Campus, 1997; pp. 165–172
Volkmar Sigusch: Geschichte der Sexualwissenschaft, Frankfurt/M., New York: Campus, 2008 ; pp. 52–80, 285-307, 597-599
Volkmar Sigusch & Günter Grau (eds.): Personenlexikon der Sexualforschung, Frankfurt/M., New York: Campus, 2009 ; pp. 52–61

External links

1872 births
1922 deaths
People from Delmenhorst
People from the Grand Duchy of Oldenburg
German dermatologists
German sexologists
German LGBT rights activists